Stola was the traditional garment of Roman women, corresponding to the toga worn by men.

Stola may also refer to:
 Stola (automotive company), an Italian automotive company founded in 1919 
 Štôla, village in Slovakia
 Dariusz Stola, a professor of history at the Institute of Political Studies of the Polish Academy of Sciences

See also 

 Stole (disambiguation)
 Stolas (disambiguation)